Twin Grove is an unincorporated community and census-designated place (CDP) in McLean County, Illinois, United States. As of the 2020 census, Twin Grove had a population of 1,524.

Geography
Twin Grove is in western McLean County on both sides of Illinois Route 9.

Kings Mill Creek flows southward through the western part of the community, leading to the Middle Fork of Sugar Creek, part of the Sangamon River watershed flowing west to the Illinois River.

Demographics

References

Census-designated places in McLean County, Illinois
Census-designated places in Illinois